Siphoviridae is a family of double-stranded DNA viruses in the order Caudovirales. Bacteria and archaea serve as natural hosts. There are 1,166 species in this family, assigned to 366 genera and 22 subfamilies. The characteristic structural features of this family are a nonenveloped head and noncontractile tail.

Structure

Viruses in Siphoviridae are non-enveloped, with icosahedral and head-tail geometries (morphotype B1) or a prolate capsid (morphotype B2), and T=7 symmetry. The diameter is around 60 nm. Members of this family are also characterized by their filamentous, cross-banded, noncontractile tails, usually with short terminal and subterminal fibers. Genomes are double stranded and linear, around 50 kb in length, containing about 70 genes. The guanine/cytosine content is usually around 52%.

Life cycle
Viral replication is cytoplasmic. Entry into the host cell is achieved by adsorption into the host cell. Replication follows the replicative transposition model. DNA-templated transcription is the method of transcription. Translation takes place by -1 ribosomal frameshifting, and  +1 ribosomal frameshifting. The virus exits the host cell by lysis, and holin/endolysin/spanin proteins. Bacteria and archaea serve as the natural host. Transmission routes are passive diffusion.

Taxonomy

The following subfamilies are recognized:

 Arquatrovirinae
 Arquatrovirus
 Camvirus
 Likavirus
 Azeredovirinae
 Dubowvirus
 Phietavirus
 Bclasvirinae
 Acadianvirus
 Coopervirus
 Pregunavirus
 Pipefishvirus
 Rosebushvirus
 Bronfenbrennervirinae
 Biseptimavirus
 Peevelvirus
 Chebruvirinae
 Brujitavirus
 Dclasvirinae
 Hawkeyvirus
 Plotvirus
 Deejayvirinae
 Kenoshvirus
 Secretariavirus
 Tanisvirus
 Dolichocephalovirinae Berteleyvirus Colossusvirus Poidextervirus Spirovirus Gochnauervirinae Dragolirvirus Harrisonvirus Vegavirus Wandersvirus Guernseyvirinae Cornelivirus Jerseyvirus Kagunavirus Gutmannvirinae Carmenvirus Pobcunavirus Hendrixvirinae Brynievirus Cauhtlivirus Kwaitsingvirus Nochtlivirus Sainkungvirus Shamshuipovirus Wainchavirus Wongtaivirus Yautsimvirus Langleyhallvirinae Getalongvirus Horusvirus Phystavirus Mccleskeyvirinae Limdunavirus Unaquatrovirus Mclasvirinae Bongovirus Reyvirus Nclasvirinae Bettesrvirus Charlievirus Redivirus Nymbaxtervirinae Baxtervirus Nymphaduravirus Pclasvirinae Bignuzvirus Fisburnevirus Phayoncevirus Queuovirinae Amoyvirus Nipunavirus Nonagvirus Seuratvirus Skryabinvirinae Bambunaquatrovirus Puchinovirus Trabyvirinae Jelitavirus Slepowrronvirus
 Tybeckvirinae
 Douglasvirus
 Lenusvirus
 Lideunavirus
 Maenadvirus

The following genera are unassigned to a subfamily:

 Abbeymikolonvirus
 Abidjanvirus
 Agmunavirus
 Aguilavirus
 Ahduovirus
 Alachuavirus
 Alegriavirus
 Amigovirus
 Anatolevirus
 Andrewvirus
 Andromedavirus
 Annadreamyvirus
 Appavirus
 Apricotvirus
 Arawnvirus
 Armstrongvirus
 Ashduovirus
 Attisvirus
 Attoomivirus
 Audreyjarvisvirus
 Austintatiousvirus
 Avanivirus
 Bantamvirus
 Barnyardvirus
 Beceayunavirus
 Beetrevirus
 Behunavirus
 Bernalvirus
 Betterkatzvirus
 Bievrevirus
 Bingvirus
 Bowservirus
 Bridgettevirus
 Britbratvirus
 Bronvirus
 Brussowvirus
 Camtrevirus
 Casadabanvirus
 Cbastvirus
 Cecivirus
 Ceduovirus
 Ceetrepovirus
 Cequinquevirus
 Chenonavirus
 Cheoctovirus
 Chertseyvirus
 Chivirus
 Chunghsingvirus
 Cimpunavirus
 Cinunavirus
 Coetzeevirus
 Colunavirus
 Coralvirus
 Corndogvirus
 Cornievirus
 Coventryvirus
 Cronusvirus
 Cukevirus
 Daredevilvirus
 Decurrovirus
 Delepquintavirus
 Demosthenesvirus
 Detrevirus
 Deurplevirus
 Dhillonvirus
 Dinavirus
 Dismasvirus
 Doucettevirus
 Edenvirus
 Efquatrovirus
 Eiauvirus
 Eisenstarkvirus
 Elerivirus
 Emalynvirus
 Eyrevirus
 Fairfaxidumvirus
 Farahnazvirus
 Fattrevirus
 Feofaniavirus
 Fernvirus
 Fibralongavirus
 Fowlmouthvirus
 Franklinbayvirus
 Fremauxvirus
 Fromanvirus
 Gaiavirus
 Galaxyvirus
 Galunavirus
 Gamtrevirus
 Gesputvirus
 Getseptimavirus
 Ghobesvirus
 Gilesvirus
 Gillianvirus
 Gilsonvirus
 Glaedevirus
 Godonkavirus
 Goodmanvirus
 Gordonvirus
 Gordtnkvirus
 Gorganvirus
 Gorjumvirus
 Gustavvirus
 Halcyonevirus
 Hattifnattvirus
 Hedwigvirus
 Helsingorvirus
 Hiyaavirus
 Hnatkovirus
 Holosalinivirus
 Homburgvirus
 Hubeivirus
 Iaduovirus
 Ikedavirus
 Ilzatvirus
 Incheonvirus
 Indlulamithivirus
 Inhavirus
 Jacevirus
 Jarrellvirus
 Jenstvirus
 Jouyvirus
 Juiceboxvirus
 Junavirus
 Kairosalinivirus
 Kamchatkavirus
 Karimacvirus
 Kelleziovirus
 Kilunavirus
 Klementvirus
 Knuthellervirus
 Kojivirus
 Konstantinevirus
 Korravirus
 Kostyavirus
 Krampusvirus
 Kryptosalinivirus
 Kuleanavirus
 Labanvirus
 Lacnuvirus
 Lacusarxvirus
 Lafunavirus
 Lambdavirus
 Lambovirus
 Lanavirus
 Larmunavirus
 Laroyevirus
 Latrobevirus
 Leicestervirus
 Lentavirus
 Liebevirus
 Liefievirus
 Lillamyvirus
 Lokivirus
 Lomovskayavirus
 Luckybarnesvirus
 Luckytenvirus
 Lughvirus
 Lwoffvirus
 Magadivirus
 Majavirus
 Manhattanvirus
 Mapvirus
 Mardecavirus
 Marienburgvirus
 Marvinvirus
 Maxrubnervirus
 Mementomorivirus
 Metamorphoovirus
 Minunavirus
 Moineauvirus
 Montyvirus
 Mudcatvirus
 Mufasoctovirus
 Muminvirus
 Murrayvirus
 Nanhaivirus
 Nazgulvirus
 Neferthenavirus
 Nesevirus
 Nevevirus
 Nickievirus
 Nonanavirus
 Nyceiraevirus
 Oengusvirus
 Omegavirus
 Oneupvirus
 Orchidvirus
 Oshimavirus
 Pahexavirus
 Pamexvirus
 Pankowvirus
 Papyrusvirus
 Patiencevirus
 Pepyhexavirus
 Phifelvirus
 Picardvirus
 Pikminvirus
 Pleeduovirus
 Pleetrevirus
 Poushouvirus
 Predatorvirus
 Priunavirus
 Psavirus
 Psimunavirus
 Pulverervirus
 Questintvirus
 Quhwahvirus
 Radostvirus
 Raleighvirus
 Ravarandavirus
 Ravinvirus
 Rerduovirus
 Rigallicvirus
 Rimavirus
 Rockefellervirus
 Rockvillevirus
 Rogerhendrixvirus
 Ronaldovirus
 Roufvirus
 Rowavirus
 Ruthyvirus
 Samistivirus
 Samunavirus
 Samwavirus
 Sandinevirus
 Sanovirus
 Sansavirus
 Saphexavirus
 Sashavirus
 Sasvirus
 Saundersvirus
 Sawaravirus
 Scapunavirus
 Schnabeltiervirus
 Schubertvirus
 Seongbukvirus
 Septimatrevirus
 Seussvirus
 Sextaecvirus
 Skunavirus
 Slashvirus
 Sleepyheadvirus
 Smoothievirus
 Sonalivirus
 Soupsvirus
 Sourvirus
 Sozzivirus
 Sparkyvirus
 Spbetavirus
 Spizizenvirus
 Squashvirus
 Squirtyvirus
 Stanholtvirus
 Steinhofvirus
 Sukhumvitvirus
 Tandoganvirus
 Tankvirus
 Tantvirus
 Terapinvirus
 Teubervirus
 Thetabobvirus
 Tigunavirus
 Timquatrovirus
 Tinduovirus
 Titanvirus
 Tortellinivirus
 Triavirus
 Trigintaduovirus
 Trinavirus
 Trinevirus
 Triplejayvirus
 Unahavirus
 Uwajimavirus
 Vashvirus
 Vedamuthuvirus
 Vendettavirus
 Vhulanivirus
 Vidquintavirus
 Vieuvirus
 Vividuovirus
 Vojvodinavirus
 Waukeshavirus
 Wbetavirus
 Weaselvirus
 Whackvirus
 Whiteheadvirus
 Wildcatvirus
 Wilnyevirus
 Wizardvirus
 Woesvirus
 Woodruffvirus
 Xiamenvirus
 Xipdecavirus
 Yangvirus
 Yonseivirus
 Yuavirus
 Yvonnevirus
 Zetavirus

Please note that genus Inceonvirus is likely misspelled Incheonvirus.

References

External links

 Viralzone: Siphoviridae
 ICTV
 Complete Genomes of Siphoviridae

 
Virus families